Anthony Stuart Nunn (born 24 May 1927) was a British field hockey player who competed in the 1952 Summer Olympics. He was a member of the British field hockey team, which won the bronze medal. He played all three matches as forward.

External links
 
Anthony Nunn's Profile on databaseOlympics

1927 births
Living people
British male field hockey players
Olympic field hockey players of Great Britain
Field hockey players at the 1952 Summer Olympics
Olympic bronze medallists for Great Britain
Olympic medalists in field hockey
Medalists at the 1952 Summer Olympics